K-16 is a  state highway in the U.S. State of Kansas. K-16's western terminus is at a junction with U.S. Route 77 (US-77) just north of Randolph and the eastern terminus is at US-24 and US-40 in Tonganoxie. Along the way K-4 intersects many major thoroughfares including US-75 in Holton, K-4 near Valley Falls and US-59 from west of Winchester to south of Oskaloosa.

Route description

K-16 begins north of Randolph on US-77 and crosses Tuttle Creek Lake. Near the town of Blaine, K-16 crosses The Oregon Trail. K-16 continues through Holton until turning south. K-116 continues to head eastward through Larkinburg and Arrington until ending at Cummings in Atchison County.

K-16 continues through Valley Falls, crossing the Delaware River until meeting with US-59. K-16 then runs concurrent with US 59 through Oskaloosa until heading east again through McLouth and winding through Leavenworth County until coming to an end at an intersection with US-24 and US-40 in Tonganoxie.

History
Between 1927 and 1935, K-16 was located in Atchison County and Doniphan County, starting at US-73 in Atchison and ending at US-36 in Troy.

A southern terminus was located in Montgomery County and Neosho County starting in Chanute and ending at the Oklahoma state line in Coffeyville.
In 1932, the southern section was replaced by US 169. In 1935, the remainder of K-16 became part of K-7. K-16 was reassigned as a renumbering of K-24 because of the extension of US-24 into Kansas.

Major intersections

See also

 List of state highways in Kansas

References

External links

 K-16 at Route56.com

016
Transportation in Riley County, Kansas
Transportation in Pottawatomie County, Kansas
Transportation in Jackson County, Kansas
Transportation in Jefferson County, Kansas
Transportation in Leavenworth County, Kansas
U.S. Route 169